Ruth Gloria Nelson (August 2, 1905 – September 12, 1992) was an American stage and film actress. She is known for her roles in films such as Wilson, A Tree Grows in Brooklyn, Humoresque, 3 Women, The Late Show and Awakenings. She was the wife of John Cromwell, with whom she acted on multiple occasions.

Early life

Born in Saginaw, Michigan, Nelson was the daughter of Sanford Leroy Nelson and vaudeville actress Eva Mudge. She attended Immaculate Heart  Convent School in Los Angeles, studying first with Daniel Frohman and then with Richard Boleslawski at the American Laboratory Theatre in New York City during the early 1920s.

Career

Nelson made her stage debut in New York on April 4, 1928 at the Laboratory Theatre under Boleslawski's direction, portraying the title character in Jean-Jacques Bernard's Martine. Over the next two seasons, Nelson made two more appearances—in Checkhov's The Seagull and Vladimir Kirshon's Red Rust—prior to becoming, in 1931, a charter member of the newly formed theatre collective, The Group Theatre, with whom she remained throughout its run from 1931 to 1941, receiving particular praise for her performance as the chief striker's wife in Clifford Odets' play, Waiting for Lefty.

After the Group Theatre ended in 1941, Nelson relocated to Hollywood. Throughout the 1940s, she made a number of movies for 20th Century Fox and other Hollywood studios. One of these was A Tree Grows in Brooklyn (1945), directed by fellow Group Theatre member Elia Kazan. She also appeared in Kazan's film The Sea of Grass in 1947.

As her career began to take off, she was compelled to put things on hold when her husband, the director John Cromwell, a leading Roosevelt Democrat in the film industry, was falsely accused of Communism by actor Adolphe Menjou in front of the House UnAmerican Activities Committee hearings on Hollywood in 1951 and his career went on to be blacklisted. While offered a New York stage role as a wife in what turned out to be Death of a Salesman, Nelson turned it down as she did most acting offers at this time to stay in Los Angeles and support Cromwell.

Nelson had not made a Hollywood film for nearly 30 years when she appeared with her husband in 1977's 3 Women, directed by Robert Altman, and The Late Show, a film Robert Benton wrote and directed that Altman produced. The following year, she and Cromwell played husband and wife as the aged patriarchal grandparents in A Wedding, a comedy directed by Altman. 
In 1980, stepson James Cromwell appeared with Nelson in John Korty's made-for-TV movie A Christmas Without Snow; two years later, they appeared onstage together in the Public Theater's production of Botho Strauss's Three Acts of Recognition, staged by Richard Foreman. Moreover, as early as 1968, Nelson had performed onstage under her stepson's direction, giving a well-received performance as Mary Tyrone in a regional production of O'Neill's Long Day's Journey Into Night; reprising the role she'd first played on Broadway in 1957, initially as Florence Eldridge's understudy, and then as the permanent replacement for an ailing Fay Bainter during the show's national tour. Both critic Claudia Cassidy and director—and Group Theatre co-founder—Robert Lewis judged Nelson's Mary Tyrone the finest they'd ever seen.

Reviewing the 1966 revival of Thornton Wilder's The Skin of Our Teeth staged by Douglas Campbell at Minnesota's Guthrie Theatre, critic Stanley Kauffmann writes:

Nelson's final feature film appearance was in 1990's Awakenings; her performance—as the mother of a hospital patient played by Robert De Niro (a role which—in a widely disseminated contemporaneous story published by Premiere Magazine—was erroneously reported as having gone to an Oscar-flaunting Shelley Winters)—was singled out for praise by several critics, including the Wall Street Journal's Julie Salamon: "Nelson achieves a wrenching beauty that stands out even among these exceptional actors doing exceptional things." In her 2012 memoir, the film's director, Penny Marshall, recalls:

Personal life
Nelson was married twice. She wed actor William Challee on August 2, 1931. They divorced in 1937. In 1947, Nelson married actor/director John Cromwell, whom she had first met two years before on the set of Anna and the King of Siam. The marriage lasted 32 years until Cromwell's death in 1979 from a pulmonary embolism.

She was the stepmother of actor James Cromwell.

Nelson died on September 12, 1992 at her home in New York City from brain cancer complicated by a stroke and pneumonia.

Filmography

Film

Television

Notes

References

Further reading

Articles
 "Ruth Nelson, daughter of Eva Mudge". Variety. April 28, 1906. p. 5
 "Actress Who Saved Life With Flag, And Her Globe-Trotting Daughter; American Flag Saves Actress in Strike Riot; South African Miners Respected Ensign as Emblem of Liberty, Mrs. Nelson Declares". The New York World. February 6, 1914. p. 2
 Mantle, Burns (April 6. 1928). "Laboratorians Produce a Play". New York Daily News.
 Peak, Mayme Ober (December 18, 1943). "I Cover Hollywood: Former Boston Newsman to Play Woodrow Wilson". The Boston Globe. p. 12
 "Keys a Superlative Religious Hit; Production, Direction and Gregory Peck—All Bid for Academy Awards". Hollywood Motion Picture Review. December 18, 1944. p. 2
 "Ruth Nelson Stars in 'Humoresque; Character Actress in Old Newsboys' Show". The Pittsburgh Press. December 3, 1946. p. 27
 Kissel, Howard (March 30, 1990). "Times's Passage Melts 'Crucible'". New York Daily News. p. 43
 Watt, Doug (April 6, 1990). "Second Thoughts on First Nights: Miller's Timelessness, Sorkin's Trifle". New York Daily News. p. 39

Books
 Hailey, Kendall (1989). The Day I Became an Autodidact: And the advice, adventures, and acrimonies that befell me thereafter. New York: Dell. pp. 104–105. .
 Smith, Wendy (1990). Real Life Drama: The Group Theatre and America, 1931-1940. New York: Alfred A Knopf. .
 Bloom, Ken (2004). "Belasco Theatre". Broadway, Its History, People, and Places: An Encyclopedia. New York: Routledge. pp. 60–61. .
 Schickel, Richard (2005). Elia Kazan: A Biography. New York: Harper Perennial. p. 13. .

External links
 
 
 

1905 births
1992 deaths
Actresses from Michigan
American film actresses
American stage actresses
People from Saginaw, Michigan
Deaths from brain cancer in the United States
Deaths from cancer in New York (state)
20th-century American actresses
Alumni of Immaculate Heart High School, Los Angeles